Apotheosis of Democracy is a public artwork by American sculptor Paul Wayland Bartlett, located on the United States Capitol House of Representatives portico's east front in Washington, D.C., United States. This sculpture was surveyed in 1993 as part of the Smithsonian's Save Outdoor Sculpture! program.

Description

The pediment's center focal point is the figure of allegorical Peace, which is dressed in armor and is depicted protecting Genius. Leaning against Peace's proper right leg, Genius holds a torch that symbolizes immortality in his proper right hand. Peace stands in front of an olive tree. To Peace's proper left is a figure of Agriculture, and next to that figure is a reaper with his assistant, a farmer with his bull, a putti carrying grapes, and a mother with her child who plays with a ram. To the proper right of Peace is Industry, and next to him is a printmaker, an ironworker, a founder, a factory girl and a fisherman. The corners of the pediment have waves, which represent the Atlantic and Pacific oceans. The pediment is made of Georgia marble.

Condition

In 1993 Apotheosis of Democracy was surveyed by art conservators from the Save Outdoor Sculpture! program and was described as "well maintained."

Acquisition, creation and installation

The original pediment was commissioned to Erastus Dow Palmer in 1857, however, the work was never completed due to lack of funding. Another competition was held in 1908 and Bartlett was chosen. 

Barlett signed the contract for the commission in February, 1909, and in January 1915 was described as being "engaged continuously since that time" in the task, amounting to six years of work.  The figures were modeled in Paris, France and Washington in the years from 1911 to 1914, and were carved by the Piccirilli Brothers from 1914 to 1916. The pediment was dedicated on August 2, 1916.

Related works

In March, 1963 plaster maquettes of the pediment were given to the U.S. Government by Bartlett's stepdaughter, Armistead Peter III. The works are on display in the Capitol underground hallway that heads to the Rayburn House Office Building.

As of 1995 a Study for Apotheosis of Democracy by Bartlett was in the collection of the Westmoreland Museum of American Art. A bronze sculpture (54 x 54.5 x 18) on a wooden base, it depicts Peace and Genius. It was purchased in 1959 and as of 1995 it was surveyed as needing urgent treatment.

See also
 List of public art in Washington, D.C., Ward 6

Further reading

Allen, William C. History of the United States Capitol: A Chronicle of Design, Construction, and Politics. Architect of the Capitol, 2001. 
Somma, Thomas P. Paul Wayland Bartlett and The Apotheosis of democracy, 1908–1916 : the pediment for the House wing of the United States Capitol. University of Delaware Press, 1995. 
Wood, James M. Washington Sculpture. Johns Hopkins Press, 2008.

References

External links
Art and Allegory from the U.S. Capitol Visitors Center
Development of the U.S. Capitol from the Temple of Liberty
Further detail on the Agriculture section of the pediment from the Architect of the Capitol
Historical Marker Database about the Capitol and Apotheosis
Smithsonian's documentation for the model of Agriculture
Smithsonian's documentation of the model for Industry
Smithsonian's documentation of the model for Peace Protecting Genius
Temple of Liberty: Building a Capitol for a New Nation by Pamela Scott

United States Capitol statues
Outdoor sculptures in Washington, D.C.
1916 sculptures
Sculptures carved by the Piccirilli Brothers
Marble sculptures in Washington, D.C.
1916 establishments in Washington, D.C.
Sculptures of men in Washington, D.C.
Sculptures of women in Washington, D.C.
Allegorical sculptures in Washington, D.C.
Cattle in art
Water in art
Peace monuments and memorials
Pedimental sculpture